In music, Op. 163 stands for Opus number 163. Compositions that are assigned this number include:

 Diabelli – Jugendfreuden
 Saint-Saëns – Marche dédiée aux étudiants d'Alger
 Schubert – String Quintet
 Strauss – Glossen